The defending champion from 2011 was Valeria Savinykh, as there was no event in 2012, but she decided not to compete in 2013.

Tímea Babos won the title, defeating Chanel Simmonds in the final, 6–7(3–7), 6–4, 6–1.

Seeds

Main draw

Finals

Top half

Bottom half

References 
 Main draw

Soweto Open - Women's Singles
2013 Singles